A saw filer is a person who maintains and repairs saws in a saw mill. A saw filer's work area in the mill is called the filing room.

Saws used in timber mills are very large. They need maintenance for safe operation. Repair of damaged saws requires a degree of skill. It takes a year of saw filing to become proficient.

Automated equipment has continued to be developed and implemented to improve saw repair quality, with the end goal of operational uptime and productivity.

Bandsaw filing 
Bandsaws in timber mills range in size from about (4" x 22ga x 10') to (16" x 11ga x 62') and can use any of the three main different saw band types: 
Single-cut saws have, as the name implies, teeth on one side, allowing for cutting in one direction only.
Double-cut saws have teeth on both sides. These types are designed for machinery that allows the log or work piece to be cut from either the front or the back direction of travel. 
"Sliver tooth" saws have teeth on both sides but they have different profiles. The (usual) front side have teeth with a regular style tooth. The back of these saws have a longer style. The log is cut in a forward direction as with a single-cut but as the log returns, the saw de-burrs the cut (path where the saw passes) allowing for a cleaner finish. They are run for 4 to 24 hours then sent to the saw filer for maintenance.

The saw filer inspects the saw for needed repairs then gums, fits and benches the saw as necessary. 

Gumming involves grinding the gullets of the saw teeth to a particular shape. The saw filer uses a semi or fully automatic grinding machine for this. Saw bands operate under high stress and heat and in the presence of wood chips. Carbon migrates into the steel from the wood. Gumming prevents case hardening and fatigue cracking of the saw band gullets. Resaw Bandsaws (teeth on one side only) may be left or right-handed, depending on which way the teeth are pointing and which way the plank falls from the log when cutting. Double cut saws (teeth on both sides) are always gummed right hand teeth first.

A precise profile of the tooth (including gullet area, hook angle and top clearance angle) must be maintained for proper saw operation and wood chip removal. Ease of cutting greatly depends on this. The shape is determined by the type of wood and cutting conditions. A saw filer will maintain the gullet shape by manually shaping the grinding wheel with a dressing stone, and the set up of his grinding machine. Variations include face angle, face length, back angle, gullet width and depth, and a frost notch (if necessary). Typical bandsaw tooth dimensions are 1-3/4" tooth space x 3/4" gullet depth x 3/4" gullet width (grinding wheel width) x 30deg face angle x 16deg back angle.

Fitting means tooth dressing and involves swaging, shaping, gauging, and grinding. The tip of the saw tooth is swaged to a flare, then the sides are compressed in slightly with a shaper tool to an exact kerf.  Then a final grinding pass is made.  The usual gauged tolerance is +/- .005" in kerf, and < .003" side to side variation. The same grinding machinery used for gumming is used for fitting.

The saw kerf is usually made this way from the base saw metal. Sometimes, however, the kerf is made with stellite or carbide tips, in which case swaging and shaping isn't needed, although gumming is still required.  The kerf may also be 'set' with a punch and hammer, with the teeth bent left, right, left... Set teeth are rarely used.

Benching is the leveling and tensioning of the saw.  When a saw band is run on a mill it is stretched with force, and during operation the cutting edge heats up.  These forces and temperatures could cause the saw to deform. Benching deforms an un-mounted saw in a way that counteracts the operating stresses.

Benching is done in a dark room with a stretcher-roller machine and flat anvil. A single light at the benchman’s work station, along with ground gauges, allows the saw filer to measure level and tension. 

Leveling is done with a crossface hammer and stretcher-roller adjustments. Cross face hammers are available in left and right hand versions.  Each filer has his own hammer which he carefully dresses.

Tensioning is done with the stretcher-roll. This machine has hardened rollers above and below the saw. They rotate slowly (one is powered, while one runs free) and pinch the saw when a lever is cranked, rolling a thin strip through the length of the saw, stretching the metal where it was rolled. Careful placement and force of the rolls deform the metal in a way that counteracts the forces the saw sees during operation. More rolls are placed in the midsection of the saw. Resaws have the back pulled to counteract the uneven heating of the cutting edge. This is done by rolling the back (non cutting edge) of the saw. The back is measured with a three pin gauge, and is usually around .003" per three feet curved.

Other bandsaw duties include welding broken teeth, fixing cracks, and trouble shooting lumber defects.

CNC equipment has evolved to the point of being able to do significant benching and fitting tasks without human monitoring. 

Most of the above terms are North American and are called different things in Australia, New Zealand as well as elsewhere in the world. 
A saw filer does both the tasks of the benchman and filer at the same time, with no distinction between the tasks as well as having to do circular saws and bandsaws.
This like filing rooms are called Saw Shops in Australia. Most Saw Mills in Australia and New Zealand run a stellite tipped bandsaw in which the majority of what is stated above becomes redundant as it is specifically for sharpening and making the swaged tipped saws.

Circular saw benching
Saw filers have the same maintenance duties with circular saws as they do with band saws, with a few exceptions;
leveling is done mostly with specialized hammers of which there are 3 main types Dog head (side on profile resembles a dogs snout), twist face (A double sided hammer in which the faces are in a 45 degree alignment) and cross face ( faces are at 90 degrees to one another) and anvils (there are 2 main type of anvils dead (for levelling the saw) and live(for both leveling and tensioning the saw), although stretcher-roller machines are also used for leveling and tensioning.  
Circular saws can be solid tooth (straight saw steel which are bent to give clearance of the saw blade) or can have carbide, Stellite or insert  teeth that don't need swaging.
Fatigue cracking of the tooth gullet is not as common as in band saws.

See also
Bandsaw
Circular saw
Saw mill
Saw
Portable sawmill

References

Industrial occupations
Metalworking occupations
Saws